Trail of the White Worm is an audio drama based on the long-running British science fiction television series Doctor Who. This audio drama was produced by Big Finish Productions.

This is the first part of a two-part story, the second part being The Oseidon Adventure.

Plot 
Derbyshire, 1979.  A legendary giant white worm is sought after by the Doctor, Leela and the Master.

Cast 
 The Doctor – Tom Baker
 Leela – Louise Jameson
 The Master – Geoffrey Beevers
 Colonel Spindleton – Michael Cochrane
 Demesne Furze – Rachael Stirling

Continuity 
Geoffrey Beevers played the Master, alongside Tom Baker as the Fourth Doctor, in the 1981 television story The Keeper of Traken.
The Fourth Doctor also encountered the Master in The Deadly Assassin and Tom Baker's last television story, Logopolis.
The version of the Master that Beevers plays has an emaciated, corpse-like appearance.  This was first seen in The Deadly Assassin, although in that story, the Master was played by Peter Pratt.
For the Doctor and the Master, Trail of the White Worm takes place between The Deadly Assassin and The Keeper of Traken.
The Doctor notices that the Master looks different, less emaciated, reflecting the differences in appearance in The Deadly Assassin and The Keeper of Traken.  This may have been a result of the aborted rejuvenation at the end of The Deadly Assassin.
Beevers previously reprised the role of the Master in two Big Finish audios, Dust Breeding and Master, both with the Seventh Doctor.  In those dramas, the Master had reverted to his former deteriorated state, after losing the form he gained at the end of The Keeper of Traken.

Notes
Michael Cochrane appeared in the Doctor Who television stories, Black Orchid in 1982 and Ghost Light in 1989 and also appeared in another Big Finish story No Man's Land featuring the Seventh Doctor in which he also played a colonel.

Critical reception
Doctor Who Magazine reviewer Matt Michael called the play "lightweight", and criticised the plotting, but praised the cast.

References

External links 
Trail of the White Worm

Fourth Doctor audio plays
Master
UNIT audio plays